Hasan Tahsin was the code name of Osman Nevres (1888 – 15 May 1919), a Turkish nationalist, patriot, and journalist of Dönmeh descent.  

Hailed as a Turkish war hero, his name has been given by the Turkish Armed Forces to the Information Center of the Turkish General Staff (Genelkurmay İletişim Başkanlığı'nın Hasan Tahsin Bilgi Merkezi). A member of the Ottoman Special Organization, he unsuccessfully tried to assassinate Noel and Charles Roden Buxton in Romania during World War I. He was sentenced to five years imprisonment for the attempt but released when German forces overran Romania.

He opened fire on the Greek soldiers who landed at Smyrna (present day İzmir) on 15 May 1919 in the opening act of the Greek occupation of more than three years that extended over a large part of western Anatolia, as well as of the Greco-Turkish War. He was killed on the spot on 15 May 1919 after killing the Greek standard-bearer. At the time of his death he had been publishing and writing for the newspaper Hukuk-u Beşer
(Ottoman Turkish for Human Rights).

References 

 Report of the Inter-Allied Commission of Inquiry (May-September 1919) by the Members of the Commission; Adm. Bristol, the US Delegate - Gen. Hare, the British Delegate - Gen. Bunoust, the French Delegate - Gen. Dall'Olio, the Italian Delegate. The statements in defense of the Greek government presented by Col. Mazarakis.

1888 births
1919 deaths
Members of the Special Organization (Ottoman Empire)
Military personnel from Thessaloniki
Pan-Turkists
People of the Turkish War of Independence
Turkish people of Jewish descent
Writers from Thessaloniki
20th-century journalists from the Ottoman Empire